Miklós Horthy de Nagybánya II (14 February 1907 – 28 March 1993) was the younger son of Hungarian regent Admiral Miklós Horthy and, until the end of World War II, a politician.

Biography
In his youth, Miklós Horthy Jr. and his older brother, István, were active members of a Roman Catholic Scout troop of the Hungarian Scout Association (Magyar Cserkészszövetség), although they were both Protestant.

For a time, Miklós Jr. was the Hungarian ambassador to Brazil.

After the death of István in 1942, Miklós Jr. became more powerful in his father's government and supported his efforts to end the involvement of the Kingdom of Hungary with the Axis Powers.  But on October 15, 1944, Nazi Germany launched Operation Panzerfaust (also known as Operation Mickey Mouse).  As part of this operation, Miklós Jr. was kidnapped by German commandos led by Otto Skorzeny, and threatened with death unless his father surrendered and agreed to appoint the Arrow Cross Party as the new government. His father complied, and Horthy Jr. survived the war (he became the only of Horthy’s four children to outlive their father). 

While his father was placed under house arrest in Bavaria, the younger Miklós was sent to the Dachau concentration camp.  Late in April 1945, Miklós Jr. was taken to the Tyrol with other prominent inmates of Dachau. There the SS abandoned their prisoners as Allied forces advanced. The younger Miklós Horthy was liberated by the Fifth U.S. Army on May 5, 1945.

Father and son went into exile in Portugal, where Miklós Horthy Jr. lived almost fifty years before dying at Estoril, near Lisbon, in 1993.  He had two daughters with his first wife Countess Mária Consueló Károlyi (1905–1976), Zsófia Horthy (1928–2004, Mrs Henry Freytag, then Mrs Charles Filliettaz) and Nicolette Horthy (1929–1990, Baroness Georg Bachofen von Echt). He was also a founding partner of Hovione, a Portuguese pharmaceutical company.

References

1907 births
1993 deaths
People from Pula
Hungarian politicians
Hungarian nobility
Dachau concentration camp survivors
Miklos II
Hungarian anti-communists
Kidnapped Hungarian people
Missing person cases in Hungary
International Olympic Committee members